Stictic acid is an aromatic organic compound, a product of secondary metabolism in some species of lichens.

Stictic acid is the subject of preliminary biomedical research. Stictic acid has cytotoxic and apoptotic effects in vitro. Computational studies suggest stictic acid may also stimulate p53 reactivation.

References 

Phenolic acids
Phenol ethers
Oxygen heterocycles
Lactones
Lichen products